In Roman literature of the early 1st century CE, the Moesi ( or ; , Moisoí or Μυσοί, Mysoí;  or Moesae) appear as a Paleo-Balkan people who lived in the region around the River Timok to the south of the Danube. The Moesi don't appear in ancient sources before Augustus's death in 14 CE and are mentioned only by three authors: Ovid, Strabo and Livy. Recent research suggests that a Paleo-Balkan people known as the Moesi never actually existed but the name was transplanted from Asia Minor to the Balkans by the Romans as an alternative name for the Dardani, a people who lived in the later province of Moesia. This decision in Roman literature is linked to the appropriation of the name Dardani in official Roman ideological discourse as Trojan ancestors of the Romans and the creation of a fictive name for the actual Dardani who were seen as barbarians and antagonists of Rome in antiquity.

The name Moesia was given first to the province of Moesia Superior and expanded into Moesia Inferior along the Danube. After the recreation of Dardania, Moesia referred to Moesia Prima, the northern part of Moesia Superior. A civitas of the Moesi was located around Ratiaria in the first century AD.

Name
The ethnic name of the Balkan Μοισοί Moesi, as well as of the Anatolian Μυσοί Mysoi, seems to be based on the root Masa, from the Paleo-Balkan word for 'horse', *me(n)za-; also the ethnic name Muška seems to be a suffixal derivative holding some kind of semantic distinction from the original root. They have been connected with the Albanian word for 'mule' mushk(ë) (virtually identical to Muška/i), Romanian muşcoiu and Aromanian musca, as well as in almost all Slavic languages (cf. Old Church Slavonic мьзгъ or мьскъ, Serbo-Croatian mazak or maz(a)g, Old Czech mesh, mzha, mezek, mezk 'hinny', Old Russian москъ, мъскъ or мьскъ etc.). The root is generally considered to have originated in the Balkans and thereafter spreading into the Slavic zone.

Already in the 19th century German linguist Gustav Meyer suggested a link between Μυσοί and Albanian mushk. He perceived mushk as a suffixal formation *mus-k-o-, noting the phonetic similarity between the terms. Furthermore, he provided the evidence of a fragment written by Anacreon mentioning the Mysians of Anatolia as 'inventors' of the interbreeding between jacks and mares. Also according to Mayer the northern parts of Anatolia might have been the homeland of the mules. A connection of Mysians with mules is also present already in Homer's Iliad. Further relevant Paleo-Balkan evidence can be seen in Iuppiter Menzanas, mentioned in a passage written by Festus in relation to a Messapian horse sacrifice, and in ΜΕΖΗΝΑ̣Ι from a Thracian inscription on the Duvanli gold ring also bearing the image of a horseman. Both these attestations might indicate that *me(n)zana- means 'horseman' and consequently that the root *me(n)za- means 'horse'. The term has been further compared with Albanian mëz or mâz 'foal', which also finds a correlation with Romanian mînz.

The province of Moesia was named after the Moesi.

Ancient literature

In the late 1st century BCE, in Rome a new ideological discourse was formed. Propagated by poets like Horace and Ovid, it constructed a glorious Trojan past for the Romans, who were claimed to be descendants of Trojan Dardanians. In the years before the Trojan origin story became the official Roman narrative about their origins, the Romans came into conflict in the Balkans with a people who were known as the Dardani. In public discourse this created the problem that the Roman army could be seen as fighting against a people who could be related to the ancestors of the Romans. The image of the historical Dardani in the 1st century BC was that of Illyrian barbarians who raided their Macedonian frontier and had to be dealt with. In this context, the name of a people known as the Moesi appeared in Roman sources. The Moesi are mentioned only in three ancient sources in the period after the death of Emperor Augustus in 14 CE. The name itself was taken from the name of the Mysians in Asia Minor. The choice seems to be related to the fact that the Trojan-era Mysians lived close to the Trojan-era Dardanians. Ovid mentions the Moesi as a people who raided the inner Balkan provinces of Romans. Strabo is the first who linked the Balkan Moesi considering them to be of the same origin as the Homeric Mysi of northwest Anatolia. Strabo constructs a story according to which Moesian presence in the Danubian area dates to the campaigns of Aelius Catus, who moved 50.000 Moesians from coastal Thrace near the Getae around 4 CE. Strabo's argumentation that the Moesi were moved in the region by Aelius Catus has been criticized for its "illogical and controversial arguments". Strabo in Geography mentions no historical events in relation to the Moesi in contrast to the historical details he reports about the Getae and the Triballi who would have been their neighbours. This is seen as more evidence that the Moesi as a people were in fact a recent construct.

As the name of the Dardani in Roman discourse became linked to the ancestors of the Romans, the actual Dardani began to be covered in Roman literature by other names. After the death of Augustus, their name in connection to the Balkans became a political problem. After the death of Augustus, the new emperor was Tiberius, his stepson and the most senior Roman general in the Balkans. As Tiberius had played a key role in the Roman conquest of the Balkans, as emperor he couldn't be portrayed as the conqueror of Dardanians, whose name had been constructed as the name of the mythical progenitors of the Romans. Thus, the decision to create a new name for Dardania and the Dardani was made. Despite this decision and the administrative use of the names Moesia and Moesi for the Dardani and Dardania, the original use of the name persisted by authors like Appian. The name Dardania was not used for several hundred years after this period in an administrative context. It was only recreated by Emperor Diocletian in the 3rd century CE.

In culture

Exonym for Bulgarians
With the formation of the Bulgarian ethnicity in the mid-10th century, the Byzantines usually called the Bulgarians Moesi, and their lands, Moesia.

See also 
 List of ancient tribes in Thrace and Dacia
 List of ancient cities in Thrace and Dacia
 Daco-Thracian

Notes

References

Bibliography

Further reading 

Ancient tribes in Serbia
Moesia